The 1990 Skate America was held at the Memorial Auditorium in Buffalo, New York. Medals were awarded in the disciplines of men's singles, ladies' singles, pair skating, and ice dancing.

Results

Men

Ladies

Pairs

Ice dancing

External links
 Skate Canada results
 http://articles.latimes.com/1990-10-20/sports/sp-2323_1_skate-america

Skate America, 1990
Skate America